Somerset South may refer to:

 South Somerset, a local government district in Somerset, England
 South Somerset (UK Parliament constituency) (1885–1918)